Laetitia "Lettice" Lee, also known as  Lettice Lee Wardrop Thompson Sim, (1731 – April 3, 1776) was an American colonial planter, society hostess, slaveowner, and châtelaine of Darnall's Chance. A member of the prominent Lee family of Virginia and Maryland, she lived a privileged life typical for members of the planter class. Unusual for her time, Lee was married three times; first to James Wardrop, then Adam Thompson, and lastly to Colonel Joseph Sim. She lived at Darnall's Chance for the second half of her life, throughout all three of her marriages.

Biography 
Lee was born in Prince George's County, Maryland in 1731. She was the daughter of Philip Lee Sr., the progenitor of the Maryland branch of the Lee family, and Elizabeth Fowke. A member of the American gentry, she was a granddaughter of Colonel Richard Lee II, a Virginian planter and politician, and his wife, Laetitia Corbin Lee, and a great-granddaughter of Richard Lee I, who immigrated to the Colony of Virginia from Shropshire, England, and Henry Corbin, one of the most influential politicians in the colony.

In 1748 she married James Wardrop, a Scottish immigrant who made a fortune as a merchant in Upper Marlboro, Maryland. She and her husband owned and managed Darnall's Chance, a large plantation in Upper Marlboro. The plantation included a large brick house, outbuildings, orchards, an ornamental garden, and a farm for livestock. They enslaved thirty-two people on their plantation, including house slaves, craftsmen, and field hands. Lee lived at Darnall's Chance for almost thirty years.

She was described by George Washington as "this fair lady".

Following her husband's death in 1760, Lee married a second time to Dr. Adam Thompson, a Scottish physician who created the American Method of smallpox inoculation. After the death of her second husband, she married a third time to Colonel Joseph Sim.

Lee died on April 3, 1776. She left the plantation to her children. In June 2004, Lee's remains were reinterred in the restored family vault, along with eight other members of the family, at Darnall's Chance. Her grave had been discovered on the grounds of the plantation seventeen years prior.

References 

1731 births
1776 deaths
American planters
American people of English descent
American socialites
American slave owners
Colonial American women
Lettice
People of colonial Maryland
American women slave owners